Spin fishing is an angling technique where a spinnerbait, a type of hybrid fishing lure with at least one freely rotating blade, is used to entice the fish to bite. When the line is reeled back, the spinnerbait blades will spin passively with oncoming the water flow, in turn stirring up significant amount of turbulence and noise, which transmit through the water and provoke predatory fish to strike the lure out of their foraging as well as territorial instincts. Spin fishing is used in both freshwater and marine environments.

Techniques
When fishing in a river the line should be cast upstream. Casting upstream and retrieving with the current results in the spinner/lure sinking faster.

Bottom bouncing
Bottom bouncing is a spin fishing technique where the spinner is cast up river from the shore, and then allowed to bounce on the river bottom until it has moved downstream. The rod tip is held higher in the air than normal and the speed of retrieval is faster. This method is commonly used when float fishing from an inflatable dingy. The spinner is cast directly behind the boat until it settles on the bottom. After the spinner has settled it bounces on the bottom, naturally attracting fish of all species. This technique is commonly used for trout in large wide rivers where an inflatable boat can be used.  All types of trout are caught with this method including brown trout, rainbow trout, bull trout, brook trout and cut throat trout.

Walking the dog

The key to "walking the dog" is making sure that there's some "line slack" immediately before each jerk, and immediately after each jerk. This gives a crisp, natural motion to the lure, unfettered by drag of any kind.

The action;
After splashdown, hold the rod low with the rod tip about  1 to 1.5 feet above the water. The lure can be activated strictly with wrist action or by using a whole arm motion that pivots from the shoulder. Switch back-and-forth between the two to prevent overuse injury to any one joint. Due to slack in the line, the rod-tip must move considerably farther than the lure. 
With an eye on the lure, keep the pulls short, about 6 inches "at the lure". At the end of each down-stroke the rod-tip is almost touching the water. Then without any pause, the rod is immediately returned to its original position.
The left hand operates on a separate brain, taking up slack line as it becomes available, while always preserving a little slack.

From the angler's standpoint, the delivery is a non-stop series of rhythmic strokes that jerk the lure by snapping slack line. 
The rod-tip must move further than six inches to overcome the line-slack, otherwise a short jerk would be unproductive. From the fish's standpoint, it's a frightened creature that's basically treading water with a lot of wasted motion. The success of walking the dog is partly because the lure never stops moving, making it difficult for bass to get a good look. In addition, the lure spends its time scooting back-and-forth with little meaningful forward progress, in other words, walking the dog offers deceptively slow coverage yet the lure is hard to identify.

Target species
Most species of fish can be caught by spin fishing; however, some are more susceptible to this technique than others.

Common freshwater targets are trout, salmon, perch, chub, Bream, pike, Walleye, Blue Kurper and Bass.

Types of spinner
Lures and spinners are both simple and effective, with the idea to imitate prey fish for pike and zander. Why these predator fish go for them is a mystery as often they look nothing like the prey fish.  Lures, spinners, and spoons are the classic categories, but the spinnerbait has the combination of being both spinner and lure.  They all can be equally effective on their day especially in the summer and autumn months, and there are thousands to choose from made from a variety of materials. Their effectiveness is governed by weight, colour, actions of the lure and the speed of retrieval by the angler.

Notes

External links
 "They Call it Spin Fishing." Popular Mechanics, May 1953, pp. 81–88, a primary on the basics.

Fishing techniques and methods